The Pencil of Nature is a book by William Henry Fox Talbot which was the first commercially published book to be illustrated with photographs. Published by Longman, Brown, Green & Longmans in six fascicles between 1844 and 1846, the book detailed Talbot's development of the calotype photographic process and included 24 calotype prints, each one pasted in by hand, illustrating some of the possible applications of the new technology. It is regarded as an important and influential work in the history of photography and was described by the Metropolitan Museum of Art as "a milestone in the art of the book greater than any since Gutenberg's invention of moveable type."

At the time The Pencil of Nature was published, photography was still an unfamiliar concept for most people—the Athenaeum magazine described Talbot's work as "modern necromancy"—and the book was the first opportunity for the general public to see what photographs looked like. To avoid any confusion, Talbot inserted the following notice into the book:

The cover page for The Pencil of Nature clashed designs, which was characteristic of the Victorian era, with styles inspired by baroque, Celtic, and medieval elements. Its symmetrical design, letterforms, and intricate carpet pages are similar to and a pastiche of the Book of Kells.

The Pencil of Nature was published and sold one section at a time, without any binding (as with many books of the time, purchasers were expected to have it bound themselves once all the installments had been released). Talbot planned a large number of installments; however, the book was not a commercial success and he was forced to terminate the project after completing only six.

Photographs

The 24 plates in the book were carefully selected to demonstrate a wide variety of potential applications for photography. They include a variety of architectural studies, scenes, still-lifes, and closeups, as well as facsimiles of prints, sketches, and text. Due to the long exposure times involved, however, Talbot included only one portrait, The Ladder (Plate XIV). Talbot also sought to demonstrate photography's potential as a new artistic medium with images like The Open Door (Plate VI).

The complete list of plates is as follows:

Part 1
I. Part of Queen's College, Oxford
II. View of the Boulevards at Paris
III. Articles of China
IV. Articles of Glass
V. Bust of Patroclus
Part 2
VI. The Open Door
VII. Leaf of a Plant
VIII. A Scene in a Library
IX. Fac-simile of an Old Printed Page
X. The Haystack
XI. Copy of a Lithographic Print
XII. The Bridge of Orléans
Part 3
XIII. Queen's College, Oxford: Entrance Gateway
XIV. The Ladder
XV. Lacock Abbey in Wiltshire
Part 4
XVI. Cloisters of Lacock Abbey
XVII. Bust of Patroclus
XVIII. Gate of Christchurch
Part 5
XIX. The Tower of Lacock Abbey
XX. Lace
XXI. The Martyrs' Monument
Part 6
XXII. Westminster Abbey
XXIII. Hagar in the Desert
XXIV. A Fruit Piece

Text
Each plate is accompanied by a short text which describes the scene and the photographic processes involved in obtaining it. Talbot emphasized the practical implications of his images (for instance, "The whole cabinet of a Virtuoso and collector of old China might be depicted on paper in little more time than it would take him to make a written inventory describing it in the usual way."), but he also recognized their artistic value ("The chief object of the present work is to place on record some of the early beginnings of a new art, before the period, which we trust is approaching, of its being brought to maturity by the aid of British talent.")

Due to the novelty of the subject, Talbot needed to point out some things that seem obvious today; for instance, "Groups of figures take no longer time to obtain than single figures would require, since the Camera depicts them all at once, however numerous they may be." He also speculated about such questions as (among others) whether photographs would stand up as evidence in court and whether a camera could be made to record ultraviolet light.

At the beginning of the book, Talbot included an incomplete history of his development of the calotype, titled "Brief Historical Sketch of the Invention of the Art." The history ends rather abruptly, and though Talbot expressed his intention to complete it at a later date, he never did.

Editions
About 40 "substantially complete" copies of the original 1844-1846 edition still exist. At least two facsimile editions have been issued:
 New York: Da Capo Press, 1969.
 New York: Hans P. Kraus, Jr., 1989. 
 Bath: Monmouth Calotype 1989

External links

References

Photographic collections and books
Photography in the United Kingdom
1844 books
1846 books
Unfinished books